Bañado de Ovanta is a town in Catamarca Province, Argentina. It is the head town of the Santa Rosa Department. The town was established in 1981 by Provincial decree.

External links

Populated places in Catamarca Province
Populated places established in 1981
Municipalities of Argentina